Fassitt House is a historic home located at Berlin, Worcester County, Maryland, United States. It is a -story Flemish bond brick house erected about 1669 on property bordering Sinepuxent Bay. The main side features a carefully laid decorative checkerboard brick pattern. The interior features fine examples of Georgian raised-panel woodwork finish in the first-floor rooms.  The property includes two historic outbuildings, a shingled frame smokehouse and a log corncrib, and a modern one-story guest house.

Fassitt House was listed on the National Register of Historic Places in 1996.

References

External links
, including photo from 1994, at Maryland Historical Trust

Berlin, Maryland
Historic American Buildings Survey in Maryland
Houses in Worcester County, Maryland
Houses on the National Register of Historic Places in Maryland
Georgian architecture in Maryland
Houses completed in 1730
National Register of Historic Places in Worcester County, Maryland
1730 establishments in the Thirteen Colonies